Internacional de Madrid, simply known as Internacional or Inter de Madrid, is a Spanish football team based in Villaviciosa de Odón, in the Community of Madrid. Founded in 2002, it plays in Primera División RFEF – Group 1, holding home games at the Campos Municipales de Villaviciosa de Odón.

History

International de Madrid was founded in 2002 by a group of businesspersons. The idea of creating the club came to Stephen Kenneth Newman, co-owner of the real estate services consulting company. In its first season, the club joined the Tercera Regional (eighth tier), and played its home games at Orcasitas, Madrid. Internacional finished its first season being promoted after winning all the games played, scoring 187 goals and conceding only 25.

In 2003, the club took the place of Sporting Getafe CF, relegated from the fifth tier, and played in Primera Regional (sixth division). It achieved a second consecutive promotion in its second season, again leading its group, with 128 goals for and only 17 against.

Internacional de Madrid continued the following seasons playing in Regional Preferente, 5th tier. In 2010 they achieved for the first time the promotion to Tercera División by finishing as runners-up of their group.

In 2016, Internacional moved from Moraleja de Enmedio to Boadilla del Monte.

Internacional won the Madrid group in the 2017–18 Tercera División and gained promotion to Segunda División B for the first time with a 1–1 aggregate away goals victory over CD Tenerife B in the playoffs. Before the start of the 2018-19 season Marcos Jiménez became the club's head coach. In its first season in the Segunda División B the club finished 14th and remained its place in this category.

On 30 June 2020, DUX Gaming, a Spanish eSports club, announced the co-ownership of the club. The club also announced the renaming of the team to DUX Internacional de Madrid. At the same time, the club moved their headquarters to Villaviciosa de Odón.

On 1 September 2022, the club resigned from 2022–23 season due to economic problems. Five days later, Dux announced their dissociation from the club.

Season to season

2 seasons in Primera División RFEF
3 seasons in Segunda División B
8 seasons in Tercera División

Current squad

Honours
Tercera División: 2017–18

Stadiums
 Municipal de Orcasitas (2002-2004)
 Municipal Dehesa de la Villa (2004-2006)
 Municipal de Moraleja de Enmedio (2006-2016)
 Municipal de Boadilla del Monte (2016–20)
 Municipal de Villaviciosa de Odón (2020-)

See also
DUX Logroño

References

External links

Futbolme team profile 
www.futmadrid.com 
Federación de Futbol de Madrid 
Club & stadium history Estadios de España 

Football clubs in the Community of Madrid
Association football clubs established in 2002
2002 establishments in Spain
Primera Federación clubs